Harogadde Manappa Nayak (1931 - 10 November 2000) was an academician, writer and folklorist.

Early life and career
He was born in the village Harogadde, Shimoga district in Karnataka. He served as a lecturer, and then professor, at the Mysore University, before being appointed the Director of the Kuvempu Institute of Kannada Studies at the university.
Appointed the Vice-chancellor of Gulbarga University on 2 November 1984, he served until 15 February 1987, when he resigned citing moral responsibility for examination malpractices.

Death
Nayak died, following a heart attack, in Mysore in the year 2000, at the age of 69.

Literary works
 Namma Maneya Deepa, collection of essays
 Kannada Vratha
 Karnataka (1992)
 South Indian Studies (edited with B R Gopal, 1990)
 Samprati (1988)
 Soolangi, a collection of thirty reflective essays (1985)
 Epic in Indian literature (1985)
 Impact of Marxism on Indian life and literature - proceedings of a national seminar (editor, 1972)
 Janapada Swarupa, collection of essays on the nature and scope of folklore (1971)
 Kannada - Literary and Colloquial, a study of two styles (1967)

Accolades
 1985 - Nayak was presided the chair of 57th Kannada Sahitya Sammelana held in Bidar.
 1989 - Sahitya Akademi Award for the work Samprati, collection of column writing.

References

Kannada-language writers
1931 births
2000 deaths
People from Shimoga
Kannada people
Recipients of the Sahitya Akademi Award in Kannada
Academic staff of the University of Mysore